This is a list of full-service television stations in the United States having call signs which begin with the letter W. Stations licensed to transmit under low-power specifications—ex., WOCV-CD, W16DQ-D and WIFR-LD—have not been included. This also pertains to low-power licenses transmitting over the spectrum of a full-power license. (WBTS-CD transmits over full-power WGBX-TV's spectrum, but is excluded as it is classified as a low-power license).

A blue background indicates a station transmitting in the ATSC 3.0 format over-the-air; details about the station's alternate availability in the original ATSC format are contained in its article. Television networks listed with each respective station are the primary affiliation listed; details about other network affiliations with these channels are contained in their respective articles.

See also the list of TV stations beginning with K and the list of TV stations beginning with C.

See also
 Call signs in North America#United States
 List of United States over-the-air television networks